Baiyun North railway station is a railway station in Baiyun District, Guiyang, Guizhou, China. It is an intermediate stop on the Chengdu–Guiyang high-speed railway. It opened on 30 December 2019. The station became a stop on the Guiyang railway loop line when passenger services opened on that line on 30 March 2022.

References 

Railway stations in Guizhou
Railway stations in China opened in 2019